Vasili Vladimirovich Pichul (15 June 1961 – 26 July 2015) was a Soviet and Russian film director, best known for his film Little Vera (Маленькая Вера, "Malenkaya Vera" in Russian), released in 1988. His film How Dark the Nights Are on the Black Sea was screened in the Un Certain Regard section at the 1990 Cannes Film Festival.

He died of lung cancer.

Selected filmography
 Little Vera (1988)
 How Dark the Nights Are on the Black Sea (1989)

References

External links

1961 births
2015 deaths
Soviet film directors
Russian film directors
Academicians of the Russian Academy of Cinema Arts and Sciences "Nika"